Forbidden Paradise 6: Valley of Fire is the sixth album in the Forbidden Paradise series. It is the fourth album in the series to be mixed by well-known trance DJ/producer Tiësto. As with the rest of the Forbidden Paradise series, the album is a live turntable mix. One of the tracks, Cyberia, is quite mistakenly mislabeled as one of Tiësto's own work around P2P sites.

Track listing
 Comma - "Lonely Days" [Lonely Mix] – 5:26
 MOCKBA - "Emulation" – 5:26
 C.M. - "Dream Universe" – 3:41
 Mind To Mind - "Rude Entry" – 4:04
 Ultrax - "Transvision" – 3:51
 Infinite Wheel - "Flute Lore" [Altered State II Remix] – 4:31
 West & Storm - "We'll Meet Again" – 4:52
 Stonemaker - "9000 Miles" [Remix] – 3:17
 The Discodroids - "Interspace" – 5:40
 The Object - "The Future Invasion (The Theme)" – 3:10
 Bypass - "Cyberia" [Deep Trance Mix] – 4:16
 Mark 1 - "Chemical Air" – 5:02
 Jay Ray - "3D" – 3:45
 Marco Zaffarano - "Clown Confusion" [Midget Mix] – 6:49
 L.S.G. - "Netherworld" [Vinyl Cut] – 5:49
 J.F. Sebastian - "F.A.D.O. (There Must Be A Future)" – 4:12

Tiësto compilation albums
1996 compilation albums